The Grand Cote National Wildlife Refuge was established in 1989 as part of the North American Waterfowl Management Plan. It is a  reserve located in Avoyelles Parish, near Marksville, Louisiana, in the United States.

Natural history

Grand Cote National Wildlife Refuge was once part of the large contiguous Mississippi River bottomland hardwood forest. Topography of the refuge is characterized by a large depressional basin that fills with shallow water from winter rains and backwater flooding.

During the 1970s, the area that would become Grand Cote Refuge was cleared and leveed for agricultural purposes. The area was poorly suited for farming, but provided ideal shallow flooded habitat preferred by many waterfowl and shorebird species.

Habitat management objectives are centered on providing shallow flooded habitats for waterfowl, shorebirds, and wading birds during August through March. A special emphasis is placed on providing shallow flooded rice; native moist soil plant fields preferred by northern pintails.

Underlying soils are the typical poorly drained, nutrient-rich, clays associated with a large river floodplain. These soils are capable of supporting large numbers of resident and migratory wildlife.

See also
National Wildlife Refuge

References

External links
Grand Cote at the US Fish and Wildlife Service, Department of the Interior
U.S. Environmental Protection Agency site on Grand Cote

Protected areas of Avoyelles Parish, Louisiana
National Wildlife Refuges in Louisiana
Protected areas established in 1989